La fée Urgèle, ou Ce qui plaît aux dames (The Fairy Urgèle, or What Pleases Women) is an opéra comique (specifically a comédie mêlée d'ariettes) in four acts by the composer Egidio Duni. The libretto, by Charles-Simon Favart, is based on Voltaire's  and Chaucer's "The Wife of Bath's Tale".

Performance history
The opera was first performed at the Théâtre Royal de la Cour at the Palace of Fontainebleau on 26 October 1765. The elaborate medieval staging cost 20,000 livres according to Grimm in his Correspondance littéraire. It was revived at the Comédie-Italienne on 4 December 1765 and given over 100 times in the following years, popularizing medieval settings for other operas such as André Grétry's Aucassin et Nicolette (1779) and Richard Coeur-de-lion (1784).

Roles and role creators

The Fairy Urgèle (soprano), Marie-Thérèse Laruette
Marton (soprano), Marie-Thérèse Laruette
Robinette (soprano), Marie Favart
Thérèse (soprano), Marie Favart
An old woman (soprano), Marie Favart
Robert, a knight (tenor), Clairval (Jean-Baptiste Guignard)
La Hire, Robert's squire (basse-taille), Joseph Caillot
Queen Berthe (soprano), Eulalie Desglands
Denise (spoken), Catherine Foulquier, 'Catinon'
The Lady-Attorney General of the Court of Love (spoken), Mlle Catinon
Old Lady-Councillors of the Court of Love (spoken ?), Gabriel-Éléonor-Hervé Dubus de Champville, 'Soli', and Antoine-Étienne Balletti (travesti)
The usherette (?), Mlle Léonore
Philinte, shepherd (tenor), M. Lobreau
Licidas, another shepherd (tenor), Nicolas Beaupré
Lisette, shepherdess (soprano), Mlle Adélaïde
The chief huntsman (spoken ?),

Synopsis
Robert is a knight imprisoned in a 7th-century French court controlled by women. He must answer the question: what gives the most pleasure to women? He is obliged to agree to marry an old woman who is then transformed into the beautiful Marton.

Sources
Original libretto: La fée Urgele, ou Ce qui plait aux dames, Comédie en quatre actes mêlée d'ariettes, Paris, Veuve Duchesne, 1766. Via Google Books
Antoine de Léris, Dictionnaire portatif historique et littéraire des théatres, ... (2nd edition, revised, corrected and considerably augmented), Paris, Jombert, 1763.

Cook, Elisabeth (1992), "Fee Urgèle, La" in The New Grove Dictionary of Opera, ed. Stanley Sadie (London)

External links
 
 

Operas by Egidio Duni
Comédies mêlées d'ariettes
Opéras comiques
French-language operas
Operas
1765 operas
Operas based on works by Voltaire
Works based on The Canterbury Tales